This is a list of medalists from the ICF Canoe Sprint World Championships in paracanoe, an event that made its debut in 2010 at Poznań, Poland.

Men

KL1
First contested in 2010. Classed as K-1 A before 2015.

KL2
First contested in 2010. Classed as K-1 TA before 2015.

KL3
First contested in 2010. Classed as K-1 LTA before 2015.

VL1
Was part of the VL3 category in 2010 and VL2 category in 2011.
Contested separately thereafter and classed as V-1 A before 2015.

VL2
Was part of the VL3 category in 2010, then contested as combined category (V-1 A/TA) in 2011.
Contested separately thereafter and classed as V-1 TA before 2015.

VL3
First contested as combined category (V-1 A/TA/LTA) in 2010. Contested separately thereafter and classed as V-1 LTA before 2015.

Women

KL1
Was part of the KL2 category in 2010 and 2011. Contested separately thereafter and classed as K-1 A before 2015.

KL2
First contested as combined category (K-1 A/TA) in 2010. Contested separately from 2012 and classed as K-1 TA before 2015.

KL3
First contested in 2010. Classed as K-1 LTA before 2015.

VL1
Was part of the VL3 category in 2010 and 2011, then the VL2 category in 2012.
Contested separately thereafter and classed as V-1 A before 2015.

VL2
Was part of the VL3 category in 2010 and 2011, then contested as combined category (V-1 A/TA) in 2012.
Contested separately thereafter and classed as V-1 TA before 2015.

VL3
First contested as combined category (V-1 A/TA/LTA) in 2010. Contested separately from 2012 and classed as V-1 LTA before 2015.

References
All are results listed from the 2010 championships:

Men's K-1 200 m A Final results.  - accessed 20 August 2010.
Men's K-1 200 m LTA results.  - accessed 20 August 2010.
Men's K-1 200 m TZ final results.  - accessed 20 August 2010.
Men's V-1 200 m LTA, TA, A final results.  - accessed 20 August 2010.
Women's K-1 LTA final results.  - accessed 20 August 2010.
Women's K-1 TA final results.  - accessed 20 August 2010.
Women's V-1 200 m LTA, TA, A final results.  - accessed 21 August 2010.

ICF Canoe Sprint World Championships paracanoe